"Too Much" is a song by Canadian hip hop recording artist Drake from his third studio album Nothing Was the Same (2013). "Too Much" features vocals from English singer Sampha and contains samples from his track of the same name. The song was later released as the sixth overall single from Nothing Was the Same in the United Kingdom on December 9, 2013. Prior to its release, it was added to the playlists of UK radio stations BBC Radio 1Xtra and BBC Radio 1 on October 31, 2013, and November 25, 2013, respectively.

Critical reception
"Too Much" was met with generally positive reviews from music critics. David Amidon of PopMatters wrote that it was "hard... not to look at 'Too Much' as the brief return of the album we really want from Drake. This is the sort of song where everything comes together in such new, glimmering ways as to validate any claims Drake makes to shifting the game around on opener 'Tuscan Leather'." Tim Sendra of AllMusic called "Too Much" a "brilliant combination of brag rap and quiet storm balladry." Julia Leconte of Now praised its production as "beautiful." Evan Rytlewski of The A.V. Club opined that the song "is beautiful in its achy simplicity."

Charts

Certifications

Release history

References

2013 singles
2013 songs
Drake (musician) songs
Cash Money Records singles
Republic Records singles
Sampha songs
Song recordings produced by Nineteen85
Songs written by Drake (musician)
Songs written by Emile Haynie
Songs written by Nineteen85
Songs written by Sampha